Cookie Monster is a character on the children's television show Sesame Street.

Cookie Monster or Cookie Monsta may also refer to:

People
 Daniel Brière (born 1977), French-Canadian hockey player nicknamed "Cookie Monster" by announcer Rick Jeanneret
 Carla Esparza (born 1987), American female mix martial artist nicknamed "Cookie Monster"
 Adam Sandler (costume wearer)

Arts, entertainment, and media
 Cookie Monster, a nickname for death growl vocals
 The Cookie Monster (novella), a 2004 Hugo award-winning novella by Vernor Vinge
 "The Cookie Monster", a song by Fred Wesley and Horny Horns from the compilation  album The Final Blow

Foods
 Cookie Monster, a cookie-ice cream dessert at American restaurants Cheddar's
 Cookie Monster cookies, a brand of Sesame Street snacks manufactured by Keebler

Other uses
 Cookie Monster (computer program), a 1969 malware that was written for several operating systems
 Oreopithecus bambolii, an extinct species of hominid nicknamed "Cookie Monster"